Satani is a community in Kumbungu District in the Northern Region of Ghana. It is located 8 kilometres north of Kumbungu.

References 

Populated places in Kumbungu District